Duke Adolf Friedrich Albrecht Heinrich of Mecklenburg-Schwerin (German: Adolf Friedrich Albrecht Heinrich, Herzog zu Mecklenburg-Schwerin; 10 October 1873 – 5 August 1969), was a German explorer in Africa, a colonial politician, the elected duke of the United Baltic Duchy from 5 November to 28 November 1918, and the first president of the National Olympic Committee of West Germany (1949–1951).

Biography 

Born in Schwerin, Adolf Friedrich was the third child of Frederick Francis II, Grand Duke of Mecklenburg-Schwerin (1823–1883), and his third wife Princess Marie of Schwarzburg-Rudolstadt. His younger brother was Prince Hendrik of the Netherlands, prince consort to the Dutch Queen Wilhelmina.

Explorer of Africa

From 1907 to 1908, Adolf Friedrich led a scientific research expedition in the region of the Central African Graben and traversed  Africa from east to west. In 1908, he was awarded the Eduard Vogel Medal of the Association of Geography of Leipzig. The insects from his expeditions and residence in Togo are in the Museum für Naturkunde in Berlin and in the Senckenberg Museum

From 1910 to 1911, he led an expedition to Lake Chad and the northern rivers of the Congo to the Nile in current Sudan. Adolf Friedrich and his companions explored the then little-known primeval forest region of the Congo tributaries and the basin of Lake Chad. Individual groups extended their explorations to the Bahr el Ghazal near the upper Nile, while others travelled to south Cameroon and the islands of the Gulf of Guinea. Vom Kongo zum Niger und Nil ("From the Congo to the Niger and the Nile"), a two-volume work based on the 1910–1911 expeditions, has an excellent reputation today for its detail and images.

From 1912 to 1914, Adolf Friedrich was the last governor of Togoland in German West Africa; he was invited for the official celebration of the independence of Togo in 1960. After World War I, he served as the vice-president of the privately chartered German Colonial Society for Southwest Africa; his brother Johann Albrecht was president from 1895 to 1920.

Duke of the United Baltic Duchy
After Soviet Russia had formally relinquished all authority over its former imperial Baltic provinces to Germany in the Treaty of Brest-Litovsk the Duchy of Courland was nominally recognized as a sovereign state by Kaiser William II on 22 September 1918. A temporary regency council (Regentschaftsrat) for all the Baltic provinces led by Baron Adolf Pilar von Pilchau was formed on 5 November 1918. It was to be a confederation of seven cantons: Kurland (Courland), Riga, Lettgallen (Latgale), Südlivland (Vidzeme), Nordlivland (South Estonia), Ösel (Saaremaa), and Estland (North Estonia). The capital of the new state was to be Riga. The proposed United Baltic Duchy was to be located in the future territory of Latvia and Estonia covering the territory of the medieval Livonian Confederation. The first head of state of the United Baltic Duchy was to be Adolf Friedrich, but he never assumed office. The appointed regency council consisting of four Baltic Germans, three Estonians and three Latvians functioned until 28 November 1918, without any international recognition, except from Germany.

Member of the International Olympic Committee
Adolf Friedrich then served as a member of the International Olympic Committee from 1926 to 1956 and as the first president of the National Olympic Committee of Germany from 1949 to 1951.

Personal life
Adolf Friedrich was married twice. In Gera on 24 April 1917, he married Princess Viktoria Feodora of Reuss-Schleiz (1889-1918), daughter of Heinrich XXVII, Prince Reuss Younger Line and Princess Elise of Hohenlohe-Langenburg. She died a day after giving birth to their only daughter, Duchess Woizlawa Feodora, on 18 December 1918. He later married the widow of his half-brother Duke John Albert, Princess Elisabeth of Stolberg-Rossla on 15 October 1924; they were among the guests at 
the 1937 wedding of Juliana of the Netherlands and Prince Bernhard of Lippe-Biesterfeld.

Princess Elisabeth survived her husband by only a few weeks after his death in Eutin in 1969.

Legacy
Adolf Friedrich is commemorated in the scientific names of a genus of lizards, Adolfus, and of a species of chameleon, Kinyongia adolfifriderici, as well as in the cichlid Haplochromis adolphifrederici, and in the large tree species Pouteria adolfi-friedericii.

Works

 Ins innerste Afrika. Leipzig, 1909. Translated into English as In the Heart of Africa. London: Cassell, 1910. vol. 1, vol. 2, vol. 3.
 Vom Kongo zum Niger und Nil. Leipzig:  F.A. Brockhaus, 1912. Translated into English as: From the Congo to the Niger and the Nile: An Account of the German Central African Expedition of 1910-1911. London: Duckworth, 1913. vol. 2.
 Wissenschaftliche Ergebnisse der Deutschen Zentral-Afrika-Expedition unter Führung Adolf Friedrichs, Herzog zu Mecklenburg. Leipzig, 1922. vol. 2, vol. 4, vol. 5, vol. 7.

See also
 History of Togo
 German South-West Africa
 United Baltic Duchy
 International Olympic Committee

References

External links
 

1873 births
1969 deaths
People from Schwerin
Dukes of Mecklenburg-Schwerin
German entomologists
German explorers of Africa
House of Mecklenburg-Schwerin
International Olympic Committee members
Rulers of Estonia
People of former German colonies
Recipients of the Military Merit Order (Bavaria), 1st class
Grand Crosses with Star and Sash of the Order of Merit of the Federal Republic of Germany
Recipients of the Iron Cross, 1st class
Recipients of the Iron Cross, 2nd class
Recipients of the Order of Saint Stanislaus (Russian)
Recipients of the Order of St. Anna
Recipients of the Order of Bravery, 2nd class
Grand Crosses of the Order of the Crown (Belgium)
Recipients of the Order of the Netherlands Lion
Sons of monarchs